Thomas Clarence Noyes (c. 1868 – August 21, 1912) was an American newspaper editor and baseball executive who was a co-owner of the Washington Senators of the American League with Ban Johnson from 1904 until his death.

Noyes a son of Crosby Stuart Noyes, and was an editor, part-owner, and publisher of the Washington Evening Star when he bought the club from Ban Johnson and Fred Postal.

From 1896 to 1904, Noyes owned Ingleside, an 1851 villa designed by Thomas Ustick Walter in the modern-day Mount Pleasant neighborhood.

Noyes died suddenly in 1912 of pneumonia at a Washington, D.C. hospital. He was 44.

The Senators were later sold to a group headed by Griffith in 1919.

References

External links
Minnesota Twins owners

Major League Baseball owners
Washington Senators (1901–1960) owners
Year of death unknown
Year of birth uncertain